Glenn Wilson may refer to:

 Glenn Wilson (psychologist) (born 1942), specialist in personality
 Glenn Wilson (baseball) (born 1958), former Major League Baseball outfielder
 Glenn Wilson (tennis) (born 1967), New Zealand professional tennis player
 Glenn Wilson (footballer) (born 1986), former professional football defender. Not to be confused with Glen Wilson (British footballer) (born 1929)
 Glenn Wilson (murder victim), a man murdered in 2008 and identified in 2015
 Glenn Wilson (rugby) (born Scotland, 1952) founder and former captain of the Israel rugby union team 1972-1978 
 Glenn Wilson, candidate in the United States House of Representatives elections in Michigan, 2010 and owner of an Internet service provider company

See also
 Glen Wilson (disambiguation)